Mike Fish (born 28 May 1954) is an Australian former rugby league footballer who played in the 1970s.

Playing career
Fish was graded by the Balmain Tigers in 1974. He made his first grade debut in his side's 21−14 loss to the Cronulla Sharks at Leichhardt Oval in round 18 of the 1974 season. In his first few seasons at Balmain, the club struggled on the field and claimed the wooden spoon in 1974 after coming last. In 1976, Balmain narrowly missed out on finals qualification finishing the season in 6th position. Fish finished the season as the club's top try scorer with 10 tries.

In 1977, Balmain reached the finals series for the first time since their premiership win in 1969 after finishing the season in 4th position. Balmain would reach the semi final but were defeated by the Eastern Suburbs Roosters 26–2 at the Sydney Cricket Ground. Fish also finished the 1977 season as the team's top try scorer with 13 tries. Fish was released by the Tigers at the end of the 1978 season, and subsequently never played first grade rugby league again. In total, Fish played 90 games, scored 30 tries, and kicked 4 goals.

References

1954 births
Living people
Australian rugby league players
Balmain Tigers players
Rugby league wingers
Rugby league centres
Rugby league fullbacks
Rugby league players from Sydney